The Apco Fiesta is a family of Israeli single-place and two-place paragliders that was designed and produced by Apco Aviation of Caesarea. It is now out of production.

Design and development
The Fiesta was designed as a beginner glider, plus a tandem version for flight training, the Fiesta 42 Bi, indicting "bi-place" or two seater.

The sail is made from 46gr/m2 "Zero Porosity" ripstop nylon.

The design progressed through two generations of models, the Fiesta and Fiesta II. The two-place models in the line are named for their rough wing area in square metres, while the solo ones are named for their relative size.

Variants
Fiesta XS
Extra small-sized model for lighter pilots. The glider model is AFNOR Std certified.
Fiesta S Light Mountain
Small-sized model for light-weight pilots. The glider model is AFNOR Std certified.
Fiesta M
Mid-sized model for medium-weight pilots. The glider model is DHV 1 and AFNOR Std certified.
Fiesta L
Large-sized model for heavier pilots. The glider model is DHV 1 and AFNOR Std certified.
Fiesta 42 Bi
Tandem two seat model for flight training. The glider model is AFNOR Biplace certified.
Fiesta II XS
Extra small-sized model for lighter pilots. The glider model is AFNOR Std certified.
Fiesta II S
Small-sized model for light-weight pilots. The glider model is DHV 1 and AFNOR Std certified.
Fiesta II M
Mid-sized model for medium-weight pilots. The glider model is DHV 1 and AFNOR Std certified.
Fiesta II L
Large-sized model for heavier pilots. The glider model is DHV 1, AFNOR Std and DULV certified.
Fiesta II Tandem 43
Tandem two seat model for flight training. The glider model is DHV Tandem and DULV certified.

Specifications (Fiesta L)

References

External links

Fiesta
Paragliders